The Princeton Posse are a junior "B" ice hockey team based in Princeton, British Columbia, Canada. They are members of the Bill Ohlhausen Division of the Okanagan/Shuswap Conference of the Kootenay International Junior Hockey League (KIJHL). They play their home games at Princeton & District Multipurpose Arena.

Season-by-season record
Note: GP = Games played, W = Wins, L = Losses, T = Ties, OTL = Overtime Losses, Pts = Points, GF = Goals for, GA = Goals against

Records as of February 28, 2018.

Playoffs

Records as of March 3, 2023.

Awards and trophies

Top Scorer
Dan Hillman: 2009–10
Kyle L'Arrivee: 2008–09
Most Sportsmanlike
Dan Hillman: 2007–08

Rookie of the Year
Brad Goss: 2007–08
Michael Garteig: 2008–09

Coach of the Year
Dale Hladun: 2007–08

Notable alumni

Connor McGarry - Aurora Tigers, OJHL - won Canadian National Jr. A title (Royal Bank Cup)
Cody Devitt - Yorkton Terriers, SJHL - signed pro with Rocky Mountain Rage of the Central Hockey League
Chad Hohmann – Seattle Thunderbirds, WHL, York University
Jordan Kerr - Dauphin Kings, MJHL
Seth Armitage - Utah State Aggies, ACHA
David Wyman - Utah State Aggies, ACHA
Jamie Sparkes - Brockville Braves, CCHL
Micah Anderson - Westside Warriors, BCHL
Brad Davis - Penticton Vees, BCHL
Jesse Tresierra - Langley Chiefs, BCHL
Evan Karembelas – Powell River Kings, BCHL
Michael Bunting – Notre Dame Hounds SJHL
Mike Salter - Fort William North Stars, SIJHL 
Eric Galbraith - Quesnel Millionaires, BCHL
Jordan Lane - Moncton Wildcats, QMJHL
Liam Darragh - Chilliwack Bruins, WHL
Alex Young - Alaska Avalanche NAHL
Brett VanRiper – Portage College, ACAC
Brenden Stephen – Everett Silvertips, WHL Trinity Western University
Brad Goss – Langley Chiefs, BCHL - Team Rookie of Year Award winner.
Andrew Walsh – Langley Chiefs, BCHL
Scott Ramsay – Chilliwack Bruins, WHL
Jeremy Wagner – Hannover Indians, Oberliga, Germany
Logan Johnston – Penticton Vees, BCHL
Kyle L’Arrivee – Mount Royal College, ACAC
Kieran Friesen – Edmonton Oil Kings, WHL
Dylan McKinlay – Chilliwack Bruins, WHL (Drafted by Minnesota Wild in 2010)
Michael Garteig – Powell River Kings, BCHL
Spencer Brooks – Portage College, ACAC
Matt Chomyc – Yorkton Terriers, SJHL
Nate Rempel – Lloydminster Bobcats, AJHL

References

External links
Official website of the Princeton Posse

Ice hockey teams in British Columbia
1991 establishments in British Columbia
Ice hockey clubs established in 1991